János Csík (born 20 December 1946 in Orosháza) is a former Hungarian handball player and handball coach.

In 1972 he was part of the Hungarian team which finished eighth in the 1972 Summer Olympics. He played in one match and scored two goals.

References

External links
 Profile on the Hungarian Olympic Committee official website

1946 births
Living people
People from Orosháza
Hungarian male handball players
Hungarian handball coaches
Olympic handball players of Hungary
Handball players at the 1972 Summer Olympics
Sportspeople from Békés County